Phryné is an 1893 opéra comique in 2 acts by Camille Saint-Saëns to a libretto by Lucien Augé de Lassus, based on the life of ancient Greek courtesane Phryne.

Cast
 Phryné (soprano)
 Lampito, esclave de Phryné (soprano)
 Dicéphile, archonte (bass)
 Nicias, neveu de Dicéphile (tenor)
 Cynalopex (tenor)
 Agoragine (bass)

Recordings
Phryné Denise Duval, Nadine Sautereau, Andre Vessieres, Michel Hamel, Orchestre Lyrique de l'O.R.T.F., Chorale Lyrique de l'O.R.T.F. Jules Gressier. 1960
Phryné was scheduled for revival and recording in June 2021 at the Musée du Louvre by the Opéra de Rouen Orchestra in partnership with the Palazzetto Bru Zane, but cancelled due to the corona pandemic.

References

Operas by Camille Saint-Saëns
French-language operas
1893 operas
Operas set in ancient Greece
Operas based on real people
Cultural depictions of Phryne